Raz Kinstlich (born March 27, 1978) is an Israeli politician and the mayor of Rishon LeZion as of 2018.

References

21st-century Israeli politicians
Living people
1978 births
Mayors of Rishon LeZion
Date of birth missing (living people)
Place of birth missing (living people)
The Greens (Israel) politicians